Elderton is a surname. Notable people with the surname include:

 Ethel M. Elderton (1878–1954), English statistician
 Merrick Elderton (1884–1939), English cricketer and educator
 William Elderton (ballad writer) (died  1592), English actor, lawyer, and ballad-writer
 William Palin Elderton (1877–1962), English actuary and statistician, brother of Ethel